Fraser Salter Hore (6 June 1835 – 7 July 1903) was an English cricketer. Hore was a right-handed batsman who bowled right-arm roundarm medium. He was born at Dulwich, Surrey.

Hore made his first-class debut for Surrey against Yorkshire in 1861 at The Oval. He made a further first-class appearance in that same year for the Gentlemen of the South against the Gentlemen of the North at Trent Bridge. His next appearance in first-class cricket came for the Surrey Club against the Marylebone Cricket Club at Lord's in 1866, with him making two further first-class appearances in that year, one for the Gentlemen of the South against I Zingari and another for the Marylebone Cricket Club against Sussex. In his five first-class matches, Hore scored 32 runs at an average of 5.33, with a high score of 9.

He died at Westbourne, Hampshire on 7 July 1903. His brother Alexander also played first-class cricket.

References

External links
Fraser Hore at ESPNcricinfo
Fraser Hore at CricketArchive

1835 births
1903 deaths
People from Dulwich
English cricketers
Surrey cricketers
Surrey Club cricketers
Marylebone Cricket Club cricketers
Gentlemen of the South cricketers